The 1974–75 season was Stoke City's 68th season in the Football League and the 44th in the First Division.

Stoke back in European competition were handed a tough tie against Dutch giants Ajax. After a 1–1 draw at home Stoke dominated the second leg in Amsterdam but failed to find the back of the net and were knocked out on the away goals rule. In the league Stoke continued from where they left off the previous season in good form and for the first time since the 1946–47 season they were in the race for the First Division title. However, so were a number of other clubs, and with three matches left Stoke were third and on course for their best ever finish, but they took just a point in those games and finished in 5th position. There was a double blow for Stoke as they missed out on a UEFA Cup place after West Ham United won the FA Cup.

Season review

League
Before the start of the 1974–75 season Stoke signed Sheffield United forward Geoff Salmons and lined up for the opening match a 3–0 win over Leeds United. Despite exiting Europe Stoke's form in the First Division remained good, but Tony Waddington was worried to a certain extent about his last line of defence and in November he surprisingly decided to break the club transfer record with the signing of Peter Shilton for £325,000 which at the time was also a world record transfer for a goalkeeper. Within ten days of Shilton's arrival Stoke sat at the top of the table after beating his old club Leicester City 1–0.

Stoke's progress in 1974–75, however was severely handicapped by a remarkable injury crisis, Already without Alan Bloor and John Ritchie, Jimmy Greenhoff broke his nose against Birmingham City and then Jimmy Robertson broke his leg against Coventry City on Boxing Day. Despite this Stoke kept on performing well and by February were again were on top spot. A 2–2 draw at home to Wolverhampton Wanderers cost the team another broken leg, Mike Pejic which was followed by  Denis Smith in the next home match against Ipswich Town. Yet Stoke still fought on with a reduced number of players, and after some fine results they lay in third with three games remaining If they won all three they would be champions of England for the first time. As it happened they failed to win any drawing twice and losing at Sheffield United and had to settle for fifth, four points behind champions Derby County. There was further disappointment for City as they lost out on a UEFA Cup place to Everton.

FA Cup
Stoke went down 2–0 against Liverpool in the third round.

League Cup
Stoke beat Third Division Halifax Town 3–0 before being paired with Chelsea. After two draws the tie went to a 2nd replay and thanks to two own goals Stoke recorded their biggest League Cup win, 6–2.  But they were knocked out by Ipswich Town in the next round.

UEFA Cup
Stoke were also involved in the UEFA Cup and were paired with Dutch giants Ajax. In the first leg at the Victoria Ground Ajax dominated the match and went in front through star winger Ruud Krol. Stoke, despite being outplayed, managed to find an equaliser through Denis Smith. In the second leg it was a case of the roles being reversed: this time it was Stoke who dominated the match but couldn't find a way past Piet Schrijvers, with Stoke going out on the away-goal rule.

Final league table

Results

Stoke's score comes first

Legend

Football League First Division

FA Cup

League Cup

UEFA Cup

Stoke eliminated on away goal rule

Friendlies

Squad statistics

References

External links

Stoke City F.C. seasons
Stoke